Charlene de Carvalho-Heineken (born 30 June 1954) is a Dutch billionaire businesswoman, and the owner of a 25% controlling interest in the world's second-largest brewer, Heineken N.V. She is the richest person in the Netherlands, with a net worth of $16.7 billion as of May 2021, according to the Forbes billionaires list.

Early life
Charlene Heineken was born on 30 June 1954, the daughter of Freddy Heineken, a Dutch industrialist, and Lucille Cummins, an American from a Kentucky family of bourbon whiskey distillers. She was educated at Rijnlands Lyceum Wassenaar, followed by a law degree from Leiden University.

Career
She owns a 25% controlling stake in Dutch brewer Heineken, of which she is also an executive director.

The biannual Heineken Prize for cognitive science is named after her.

Personal life
She is married to Michel de Carvalho, a financier and director of Citigroup, whom she met on a ski holiday in St. Moritz, Switzerland. He is a member of the supervisory board of Heineken NV. They reside in London with their five children.

Upon the death of her father in 2002, she inherited about £3 billion, making her the wealthiest person with Dutch citizenship. In 2019, the Sunday Times Rich List ranking of the wealthiest people in the UK named her the wealthiest woman and the 7th overall, with an estimated fortune of £12 billion.

See also
 List of Dutch by net worth

References

1954 births
Living people
Businesspeople from Amsterdam
Dutch billionaires
Dutch brewers
Dutch corporate directors
Dutch expatriates in England
Dutch people of American descent
20th-century Dutch businesswomen
20th-century Dutch businesspeople
Female billionaires
Heineken people
Leiden University alumni
21st-century Dutch businesswomen
21st-century Dutch businesspeople